Manuka Football Club is a defunct Australian rules football club that played in the AFL Canberra from 1928–1991. The club played at Manuka Oval in the inner-south suburbs of Canberra. It merged with Eastlake Football Club in 1991.

Notable players
 Adrian Barich (Played for Manuka from 1981-1983 including 1981 premiership, later played for Perth and the West Coast Eagles from 1987–1992)
 Ed Blackaby (Played for Manuka for 10 seasons, amassing 185 games, 4 years as captain coach including premierships in 1971, 1973, 1974, 1975 and 1977. Later played and coached Swan Districts, AFL Canberra Hall of Fame inductee, 2006)
 Keith Bromage (Captain-Coach 1962-1965, previously played for Collingwood and Fitzroy)
 Michael Conlan (Played for Fitzroy 1977-1989)
 Ray Donnellan (Captain-Coach 1953-1956, ex-Fitzroy)
 Robert Franklin (AFL Canberra Hall of Fame inductee, 2006)
 Peter Kenny (Played for Carlton in 1986)
 Ian Low (Played for Footscray and Collingwood from 1975 to 1980)
 Jack Dorman (AFL Canberra Hall of Fame inductee, 2006)
 Brian Quade (Captain-Coach 1980-1982, premiership 1981)
 Robert Whatman (Played for Geelong 1972-1974)

Honours
Although Manuka merged with Eastlake in 1991, the team enjoyed premiership success 16 times before becoming Southern Districts in 1991.

AFL Canberra (16):
 1931, 1935, 1938, 1942, 1949, 1950, 1955, 1967, 1968, 1969, 1971, 1973, 1974, 1975, 1977, 1981

See also
 Eastlake Football Club
 AFL Canberra
 Manuka Oval

References

AFL Canberra clubs
1928 disestablishments in Australia
1991 disestablishments in Australia
Australian rules football clubs established in 1928
Australian rules football clubs disestablished in 1991